Hiten may refer to:

 Hiten (name), Indian given name
 Hiten (spacecraft), Japanese lunar probe
Tennin, spiritual being in Japanese Buddhism

See also
Hi-Ten Bomberman, 1993 action-maze video game